The 1934 Ladies Open Championships was held at the Queen's Club, West Kensington in London from 5–11 February 1934. Susan Noel won her third consecutive title defeating Margot Lumb in the final. The Championship attracted the top players from the United States for the first time.

Draw and results

First round

Second round

Third round

Quarter-finals

Semi-finals

Final

+ Lady Aberdare also known Mrs Margaret Bruce.

References

Women's British Open Squash Championships
Women's British Open Squash Championships
Women's British Open Squash Championships
Women's British Open Squash Championships
Squash competitions in London
British Open Championships